The 1930 Tour de France was the 24th edition of the Tour de France, one of cycling's Grand Tours. The Tour began in Paris with a flat stage on 2 July, and Stage 12 occurred on 15 July with a flat stage from Montpellier. The race finished in Paris on 27 July.

Stage 12
15 July 1930 - Montpellier to Marseille,

Stage 13
16 July 1930 - Marseille to Cannes,

Stage 14
17 July 1930 - Cannes to Nice,

Stage 15
19 July 1930 - Nice to Grenoble,

Stage 16
21 July 1930 - Grenoble to Evian,

Stage 17
23 July 1930 - Evian to Belfort,

Stage 18
24 July 1930 - Belfort to Metz,

Stage 19
25 July 1930 - Metz to Charleville,

Stage 20
26 July 1930 - Charleville to Malo-les-Bains,

Stage 21
27 July 1930 - Malo-les-Bains to Paris,

References

1930 Tour de France
Tour de France stages